Jacques Max Manigat (born 29 December 1931) is a Haitian scholar. Originally from Cap-Haïtien, he is a member of the Akademi Kreyòl Ayisyen (Haitian Creole Academy). He is the author of several books on the Haitian diaspora.

References

1931 births
Living people
Haitian writers
People from Cap-Haïtien

ht:Jacques Max Manigat